The Cookies were an American R&B girl group active in two distinct lineups, the first from 1954 to 1958 which later became The Raelettes, and the second from 1961 to 1967. Several of the members of both lineups were members of the same family. Both lineups were most prominent as session singers and backing vocalists.

History
Formed in 1954 in Brooklyn, New York, United States, the Cookies originally consisted of Dorothy Jones, Darlene McCrea and Dorothy's cousin, Beulah Robertson. In 1956, Robertson was replaced by Margie Hendricks (Hendrix). The group was introduced to Ray Charles through their session work for Atlantic Records. In 1958, The Cookies performed with Ray Charles and Ann Fisher for the Cavalcade of Jazz concert produced by Leon Hefflin Sr., held at the Shrine Auditorium in Los Angeles, on August 3. The other headliners were Little Willie John, Sam Cooke, Ernie Freeman, and Bo Rhambo. Sammy Davis Jr. was there to crown the winner of the Miss Cavalcade of Jazz beauty contest. After backing Charles and other Atlantic Records artists, McCrea and Hendricks helped form the Raelettes in 1958. Pat Lyles was a Raelette, but never a Cookie.

Second lineup
In 1961, a new version of the Cookies emerged in New York, with Dorothy Jones joining newcomers Earl-Jean McCrea (Darlene's younger sister) and another of Dorothy's cousins, Margaret Ross. Jones also recorded one solo recording for Columbia in 1961. This trio had the greatest success as the Cookies: under their own name; as backing vocals for other artists, including Neil Sedaka's hit songs "Breaking Up Is Hard to Do", "The Dreamer" and "Bad Girl"; and recording demos for Aldon Music, under the direction of Carole King and Gerry Goffin. They provided the backup vocals for the Little Eva hit song, "The Loco-Motion", as well as her follow-up hit "Let's Turkey Trot", both from 1962; and for Mel Tormé's hit version of "Comin' Home Baby". They scored their biggest hit in 1963 with the song "Don't Say Nothin' Bad (About My Baby)", which reached number 3 on the Billboard R&B chart and #7 on the Billboard Pop chart.

A 1962 hit, "Chains", was recorded by the Beatles on their debut release Please Please Me. Earl-Jean McCrea left the group in 1965 after two solo singles, which included the first recording of the Goffin/King song, "I'm Into Something Good", made famous by Herman's Hermits.

The Cookies also released several recordings under other names, mostly with Margaret Ross on lead vocals. Their alternative names on recordings were the Palisades (Chairman), the Stepping Stones (Philips), the Cinderellas (Dimension) and the Honey Bees (Fontana 1939 only); record labels are given in brackets.

In April 1967, they released their last record, produced by the Tokens. Darlene McCrea returned to replace her sister for this recording.

Margie Hendrix died on July 14, 1973, at the age of 38.

Dorothy Jones died in Columbus, Ohio, from complications of Alzheimer's disease on December 25, 2010, at the age of 76.

Darlene McCrea died from cancer on February 4, 2013.

Margaret Ross, now Margaret Williams, tours today as the Cookies with new back-up singers. She also performs with Barbara Harris and the Toys occasionally.

Members

Personnel
Dorothy Jones - 1954-1958, 1961-1967
"Ethel" Darlene McCrea - 1954-1958, 1964-1967
Beulah Robertson - 1954-1956
Margie Hendricks - 1956-1958
Earl-Jean McCrea - 1961-1964
Margaret Ross - 1961-1967

Dorothy, Beulah, and Margaret were first cousins; their respective mothers were sisters. Beulah and Margaret were not members of the group during the same period, but both performed with Dorothy. Darlene and Earl-Jean were sisters, but were not members of the group during the same period.

Discography
"In Paradise" b/w "Passing Time" (Atlantic 45-1084) 1956			
"Chains" b/w "Stranger in My Arms" (Dimension 1002) (#17 U.S. Pop, 1962, UK #50, 1963) Can. #4)
"Don't Say Nothin' Bad (About My Baby)" b/w "Softly in the Night" (Dimension 1008) (#3 U.S R&B, #7 U.S. Pop, 1963, Can. #17)
"Will Power" b/w "I Want a Boy for My Birthday" (Dimension 1012) 1963
"Girls Grow Up Faster Than Boys" b/w "Only to Other People" (Dimension 1020) (#33 U.S. R&B, #33 U.S. Pop, 1963, Can. #20)
"I Never Dreamed" b/w "The Old Crowd" (Dimension 1032) 1964
"All My Trials" b/w "Wounded" (Warner Bros. 7025) 1967

Discography as backup singers
 "Drown In My Own Tears" - Ray Charles, 1955
 "Corrine Corrina" - Big Joe Turner, 1956
 "It’s Too Late" - Chuck Willis, 1956
 "Lonely Avenue" - Ray Charles, 1956
 "Halfway to Paradise" - Tony Orlando, 1961 
 "Bless You" - Tony Orlando, 1961 
 "The Loco-Motion" - Little Eva, 1962 
 "Breaking Up is Hard to Do" - Neil Sedaka, 1962
 "Keep Your Hands Off My Baby" - Little Eva, 1962
 "Comin' Home Baby" - Mel Torme, 1962
 "Next Door to an Angel" - Neil Sedaka, 1962
 "Blame It on the Bossa Nova" - Eydie Gorme, 1963
 "I Want to Stay Here" - Steve and Eydie, 1963
 "Let's Turkey Trot" - Little Eva, 1963
 "Swinging on a Star" - Big Dee Irwin and Little Eva, 1963
 "Happy Being Fat" - Big Dee Irwin, 1963
 "You're My Inspiration" - Big Dee Irwin, 1963
 "Hey Girl" - Freddie Scott, 1963
 "Bad Girl" - Neil Sedaka, 1963
 "The Christmas Song" - Big Dee Irwin and Little Eva, 1963

References

Bibliography
Clemente, John (2000). Girl Groups -- Fabulous Females That Rocked The World. Iola, Wisconsin, Krause Publications. p. 276. .
Clemente, John (2013). Girl Groups -- Fabulous Females Who Rocked The World. Bloomington, Indiana, Authorhouse Publications. p. 623.

External links
[ The Cookies] on Allmusic
The Cookies on history-of-rock.com
The Cookies on last.fm
 The Cookies on Girl Group Chonicles
 
 

African-American girl groups
Musical groups established in 1954
Musical groups disestablished in 1967
Musical groups from New York (state)
American soul musical groups
Atlantic Records artists